Danika Pisconeri (born 23 June 1991) is an Australian rules footballer who played for the West Coast Eagles in the AFL Women's (AFLW).

State football
A ruck, prior to joining West Coast, Piconeri was Subiaco's vice-captain in the WAFL Women's, where she jointly won the competition's best and fairest, the Dhara Kerr Award, with her captain Hayley Miller in 2019.

AFLW career
Pisconeri was recruited by West Coast in August that year, from the club's female academy, for the team's inaugural AFLW season as an expansion club signing, and played in the team's inaugural side. In August 2020, Pisconeri was delisted by West Coast.

References

External links 

Living people
1991 births
Subiaco Football Club players
West Coast Eagles (AFLW) players